Henry Burke was an Irish officer of arms.

Henry Burke may also refer to:

Sir Henry Burke, 7th Baronet (d. 1748) of the Burke Baronets
Sir Henry John Burke, 9th Baronet (d. 1814) of the Burke Baronets
Sir Henry George Burke, 5th Baronet (1859–1910) of the Burke Baronets
Henry Lardner-Burke (1916–1970), South African flying ace

See also

Burke (surname)